The Victoria Golf Club is a golf club in Cheltenham, Victoria, Australia. It is located in the Melbourne Sandbelt, and its course is consistently ranked amongst the best in Australia. It has hosted many events over the years including the Australian Open in 1961, 1981, and 2002 and the Women's Australian Open in 1974, 1976 and 2014.

Tournaments hosted 

 1961 Australian Open
1964 Wills Masters
1964 Victorian Open
1966 Wills Masters
1968 Espirito Santo Trophy
1969 Wills Masters
1971 Wills Masters
1973 Wills Masters
1974 Women's Australian Open
1975 Wills Masters
1976 Colgate Champion of Champions
1976 Women's Australian Open
1977 Colgate Champion of Champions
1981 Australian Open
1994 Victorian Open
1995 Victorian Open
1997 Victorian Open
1998 Victorian Open
1999 Australian PGA Championship
1999 Victorian Open
2002 Australian Open
2010 Australian Masters
2011 Australian Masters
2014 Women's Australian Open

External links

Victoria Golf Club course review, Golf Australia

References 

Golf clubs and courses in Victoria (Australia)
Cheltenham, Victoria
Sport in the City of Bayside
Buildings and structures in the City of Bayside